The 15th Rome Grand Prix was a motor race, run to Formula One rules, held on 19 May 1963 at the ACI Vallelunga Circuit, near Rome in Italy. The race was run over two heats of 40 laps of the circuit, both of which were won by British driver Bob Anderson in a Lola Mk4.

Both heats finished with the same three cars coming home in the first three places, and each time they were the only three cars to complete the distance. The grid included some Italian drivers who were relatively unknown outside their home country, and who never took part in any World Championship Grands Prix. The only one of these to threaten the leaders in this race was Franco Bernabei in his De Tomaso, but his engine blew up while he was leading the first heat and he was unable to take part in the second.

Swiss driver Jo Siffert was to have taken part in this race, having decided against competing in a sports car race in Germany on the same day. The team he was to have driven for, Ecurie Filipinetti, lobbied the Swiss Automobile Club and they refused Siffert a visa to race in Rome.

Results

Fastest lap: (Heat 1) Bob Anderson 1:30.9
Fastest lap: (Heat 2) Bob Anderson 1:29.0

References

 "The Grand Prix Who's Who", Steve Small, 1995.

Rome Grand Prix
Rome Grand Prix